Elocutionist (March 4, 1973 – 1995) was an American Thoroughbred racehorse best known for winning the second leg of the U.S. Triple Crown series.

Background
Bred by Josephine Abercrombie's Pin Oak Stud and foaled at her Versailles, Kentucky farm, Elocutionist was sired by multiple stakes winner Gallant Romeo, a son of U.S. Racing Hall of Fame inductee Gallant Man. He was out of the mare Strictly Speaking, whose sire was the very fast Fleet Nasrullah, a multiple stakes winner who broke two track records.

Elocutionist was purchased at the July 1974 Fasig-Tipton yearling sale in Lexington, Kentucky by Gene Cashman, a  Chicago native who established a large Thoroughbred racing stable. At the auction, Cashman and his trainer, Paul Adwell, narrowed their selection to two yearling colts they liked. However, unable to decide which one to buy, they flipped a coin, and Elocutionist wound up being the one Cashman bought.

1975: two-year-old season
A late bloomer, Elocutionist made his first start on October 13, 1975. The two-year-old's racing debut was a winning one, and he won all four of his ensuing starts that year including the 49th running of the Hawthorne Juvenile Stakes at Chicago's Hawthorne Race Course.

1976: three-year-old season
At age three in 1976, Elocutionist began the year with a third and a second in his first two outings, then won three races in a row including the Forerunner Stakes at Keeneland and the April 3 Arkansas Derby at Oaklawn Park. His performances earned him entry into the first of the Triple Crown races, a first for his owner, his trainer, and for his jockey, John Lively. The colt ran third in the Kentucky Derby behind winner Bold Forbes, who had been the yearling Cashman and Adwell did not buy at the auction as a result of the coin toss. However, Elocutionist came back to win the Preakness Stakes by three and a half lengths, beating runnerup Play The Red and Bold Forbes, who finished third.

Elocutionist was scheduled to run in the third leg of the Triple Crown. However, a week before the race, Paul Adwell announced the colt had suffered an injury to his right foreleg and would not run in the Belmont Stakes. Elocutionist never recovered from his injury and on September 8, owner Cashman announced that the horse was being retired and would be syndicated to stud.

During a career that spanned seven months, Elocutionist finished on the board in all twelve of his starts, winning nine, running second once, and taking third in the remaining two.

Stud record
Retired to stud duty, Elocutionist met with modest success as a sire. The best of his progeny was Demons Begone, who won the 1987 Arkansas Derby for Loblolly Stable. He was the heavy favorite going into the Kentucky Derby but began bleeding profusely during the race and had to be pulled up. Through his daughter Haute Authorite, Elocutionist is the damsire of 1993 American Horse of the Year Kotashaan.

Pedigree

Elocutionist was inbred 3 × 4 to Count Fleet, meaning that this stallion appears in both the third and fourth generations of his pedigree.

References

 Elocutionist's pedigree and partial racing stats
 May 16, 1976 St. Petersburg Times article on Elocutionist

1973 racehorse births
1995 racehorse deaths
Racehorses bred in Kentucky
Racehorses trained in the United States
Preakness Stakes winners
American Grade 1 Stakes winners
Thoroughbred family 2-s